Pleasant Valley is a very small, unincorporated community in Washoe County, Nevada, United States. The ZIP Code for Pleasant Valley is 89521. The community is part of the Reno–Sparks Metropolitan Statistical Area. Interstate 580, U.S. Route 395 and U.S. Route 395 Alternate run through it and act as dividers between the eastern and western halves of the valley.

See also
 1915 Pleasant Valley earthquake - named for Pleasant Valley in Pershing County
 Pleasant Valley, White Pine County, Nevada - a formerly populated place

References

Reno, NV Metropolitan Statistical Area
Unincorporated communities in Nevada
Unincorporated communities in Washoe County, Nevada